Ivo Karlović was the defending champion, but lost to John-Patrick Smith in the first round.

Sam Querrey won the title, defeating Rajeev Ram in the final, 6–4, 7–6(8–6).

The tournament marked the return of Juan Martín del Potro after suffered from wrist injury.

Seeds

Draw

Finals

Top half

Bottom half

Qualifying

Seeds

Qualifiers

Qualifying draw

First qualifier

Second qualifier

Third qualifier

Fourth qualifier

References
 Main Draw
 Qualifying Draw

Delray Beach International Tennis Championships - Singles
2016 Singles
2016 Delray Beach International Tennis Championships